The FAB-500 is a Soviet-designed  general purpose air-dropped bomb with a high-explosive warhead, primarily used by the Russian Air Force, former Soviet republics and customer countries. The original M-54 model was rolled out in 1954, shaped for internal carriage by heavy bombers, a low-drag M-62 version in 1962 was intended for fighter bomber external hardpoint carriage. The bomb is unguided, features a single nose fuze, and is compatible with most models of Soviet aircraft.

Operational history 
The FAB-500 was largely employed over Afghanistan by Soviet and allied Afghan forces during the 1980s and saw use during the Syrian civil war where it was carried by both Russian and Syrian warplanes. The M62 variant of the FAB-500 was used by Russian military forces in the 2022 Russian invasion of Ukraine. On 13 March 2022 and 14 May 2022, FAB-500 bombs were found in Ukrainian cities Chernihiv and Odesa.

Operational envelope (FAB-500 M-62)

 Release altitude: 
 Release speed:

Variants

 FAB-500 M-54 (ФАБ-500 М-54) – 1954 model, original high-drag model intended for internal carriage on heavy bombers, featuring a ballistic ring on the nose of the bomb to act as a vortex generator to aid the bomb’s stabilizers.
 FAB-500 M-62 (ФАБ-500 М-62) – 1962 model, low-drag model designed for external carriage on hardpoints on fighter-bombers.
 FAB-500 M-62T – heat-resistant, capable of withstanding high-temperature aerodynamic heating, arising during flight at high speeds. Developed for the MiG-25RB.
 FAB-500 M-62 MPK (ФАБ-500 М-62 с МПК)
 FAB-500T (ФАБ-500Т)
 FAB-500TA (ФАБ-500ТА)
 FAB-500ShN (ФАБ-500ШН) - parachute retarded thin cased bomb
 FAB-500ShL (ФАБ-500ШЛ) - parachute retarded high explosive bomb
 FAB-500 M46 (ФАБ-500 М46)
 FAB-500 M44 (ФАБ-500 М44)
 FAB-500 M43 (ФАБ-500 М43)
 FAB-500-300 (ФАБ-500-300) - thick cased high explosive
 FAB-500TS (ФАБ-500ТС) - thick cased high explosive and fragmentation
 FAB-500TSM (ФАБ-500ТСМ)
 OFAB-500 (ОФАБ-500) - general purpose high explosive fragmentation bomb (contains 3 x 150 kg submunitions)
 OFAB-500U (ОФАБ-500У) - delayed action fragmentation bomb
 OFAB-500ShR (ОФАБ-500ШP) - parachute retarded fragmentation bomb

See also
FAB-250
Mark 83 bomb - American counterpart

References

Aerial bombs of Russia
Cold War aerial bombs of the Soviet Union
Military equipment introduced in the 1950s